Peter Sandrini (born 20 February 1961) is an Italian-born translation theorist and terminologist. He is currently researcher at the University of Innsbruck at the department of translation studies.

Early life and career 
Peter Sandrini was born on 20 February 1961 in Bozen, Italy. In 1988 Sandrini graduated from the University of Innsbruck in Translation studies. He completed his PhD with a dissertation on legal terminology Terminologiearbeit im Recht: Deskriptiver begriffsorientierter Ansatz vom Standpunkt des Übersetzers in 1996.

Since 1992 he works as a senior researcher at the University of Innsbruck. In 1991 he was one of the founders of the professional translators association in South Tyrol Landesverband der Übersetzer (LDÜ) – L’Unione Provinciale dei Traduttori (UPT) where he served as executive director until 1994.

From 1999 to 2001 Sandrini participated in an EU-funded research project in collaboration with the European Academy of Bozen on legal and administrative terminology: Interreg II Programm der EU: Sondermaßnahme zur Überwindung der Probleme, die aufgrund der verschiedenen Sprachen, Verwaltungsverfahren und Rechtssysteme dies- und jenseits der Grenze entstehen.
From 2007 to 2009 he contributed to the EU Tempus Project CD_JEP-40090-2005 Foreign Languages in the Field of Law, when a new Centre for Foreign Languages at the Faculty of Law at the University of Zagreb was launched.
In 2007 Sandrini launched the computer-aided translation project tuxtrans, a Linux distribution with a collection of free translation tools.

Works 
Monographs
 Probleme der italienisch-deutschen Übersetzung im Bereich des Kündigungsschutzes unter Berücksichtigung der Südtirol-spezifischen Anwendungsproblematik. Glossar. Master Thesis. Innsbruck 1988.
 Terminologiearbeit im Recht. Deskriptiver, begriffsorientierter Ansatz vom Standpunkt des Übersetzers. TermNet, Vienna 1996, .

Edited Volumes (selection)
 Übersetzen von Rechtstexten. Fachkommunikation im Spannungsfeld zwischen Rechtsordnung und Sprache Narr, Tübingen 1999, .
 Terminology and Knowledge Engineering. Proceedings of the 5th International Congress on Terminology and Knowledge Engineering TKE'99. TermNet, Wien 1999, .
 TermLeg 1.0 – Vertragsrecht: Ein terminologischer Vergleich Italienisch – Deutsch. Studia, Innsbruck 2001, .
 TermLeg 2.0 – Arbeitsrecht: Ein terminologischer Vergleich Italienisch – Deutsch. Studia, Innsbruck 2002, .
 Fluctuat nec mergitur. Translation und Gesellschaft. Festschrift für Annemarie Schmid zum 75. Geburtstag. Peter Lang, Frankfurt 2005, .
 with Ingeborg Ohnheiser and Wolfgang Pöckl: Translation – Sprachvariation – Mehrsprachigkeit. Festschrift für Lew Zybatow zum 60. Geburtstag. Peter Lang, Frankfurt am Main, .

Papers (selection)
 Legal Terminology. Some Aspects for a New Methodology. In: Hermes Journal of Linguistics. 22. Aarhus School of Business 1999. pp. 101–112. 
 Localization and Translation. In: MuTra Journal, Vol 2 2008. LSP Translation Scenarios. Selected Contributions to the EU Marie Curie Conference Vienna 2007. Edited by Heidrun Gerzymisch-Arbogast, Gerhard Budin, Gertrud Hofer. pp. 167–191.
 Der transkulturelle Vergleich von Rechtsbegriffen. In: Susan Šarčević (ed.): Legal Language in Action: Translation, Terminology, Drafting and Procedural Issues. Globus, Zagreb 2009, pp. 151–165.
 The Parameters of Multilingual Legal Communication in a Globalized World. In: Comparative Legilinguistics. International Journal for Legal Communication. 2009, 1, pp. 34-48.
 Translation Practice in South Tyrol: Towards a commitment to professional translation expertise. In: Hannes Obermair, Harald Pechlaner (eds.): Eurac Research: Inventing Science in a Region. Eurac Research, Bozen-Bolzano 2022, doi:10.57749/a924-n835.

External links 
 Website Peter Sandrini
 Department of Translation Studies at the University of Innsbruck
 Website tuxtrans.org
 Peter Sandrini on Academia.edu

References

Italian translation scholars
1961 births
Living people